The Carling Black Label Cup is a one-day four-team football tournament in South Africa. Prior to 2022, the Carling Black Label Cup has been a one-day pre-season match between Soweto rivals, Orlando Pirates and Kaizer Chiefs. The teams to compete are voted in from the 16 Premier Soccer League (PSL) teams.

Similar to the now-abolished annual Telkom Charity Cup which had four entrants and the semi-final winners would play twice in one day, the Black Label Cup has four participating teams with the winners of the first matches playing twice while losers would play penalties for the 3rd and 4th place play-off. The teams and line-ups are chosen by Carling Black Label customers who submit an eleven-digit code which is found on Carling products and have their vote registered. Customers also choose which substitutions to make in-game by voting via text message.

In June 2011, South African football magazine Kick-Off conducted an interview with Carling Black Label general manager Andrea Quaye. Quaye stated that the Black Label Cup had been in the planning stages in 2010, one year prior to the announcement of the cancellation of the Charity Cup. She also stated that the competition was established by Kaizer Chiefs, Orlando Pirates and Ogilvy & Mather.

The 2018 edition was cancelled due to the 2018 FIFA World Cup.
The 2020 edition was also cancelled due to the  COVID-19 pandemic.

The 2022 edition was revamped to include 2 other teams to join the traditional teams, Kaizer Chiefs and Orlando Pirates. After fans submitted their team choices, Pretoria-based club Mamelodi Sundowns and Durban club AmaZulu FC turned out to be the favourites to fill the 3rd and 4th spots in the tournament.

Results

References 

Soccer cup competitions in South Africa